was a Japanese war criminal turned peace activist.

Tominaga served in Manchuria during the Second Sino-Japanese War. In that time, he participated in many war crimes. He served with the 39th Division, based in Hiroshima, and from July 1941 onward served in Central China. Tominaga was captured during the Soviet invasion of Manchuria in 1945. As with many other Japanese prisoners of war in the Soviet Union, he was interred in a harsh POW camp in Siberia. In 1950, he was handed over to People's Republic of China.

Tominaga was released in 1957 and returned to Japan. That same year, he co-founded a peace activist group

In 2001, shortly prior to his death, he participated in the Japanese documentary film Japanese Devils (Riben guizi).

Notes

Sources

External links
 "Recalling Japanese POWs' Life in Fushun" (China Daily August 25, 2005)

1910s births
2002 deaths